Pluchea is a genus of flowering plants in the tribe Inuleae within the family Asteraceae. Members of this genus might be known as camphorweeds, plucheas, or less uniquely fleabanes. Some, such as P. carolinensis and P. odorata, are called sourbushes.  There are plants of many forms, from annual and perennial herbs to shrubs and trees, and there is variation in the morphology of leaves, flowers, and fruits.

The genus was named for the French naturalist Abbé Noël-Antoine Pluche.

 Species
 Pluchea arabica (Boiss.) Qaiser & Lack - Yemen, Oman
 Pluchea arguta Boiss. - India, Iran
 Pluchea baccharis (Mill.) Pruski – rosy camphorweed - southeastern United States, Bahamas, Cuba, Yucatán Peninsula, Central America
 Pluchea baccharoides (F.Muell.) F.Muell. ex Benth. - Australia
 Pluchea bequaertii Robyns -central Africa
 Pluchea biformis  DC.
 Pluchea bojeri (DC.) Humbert - Madagascar
 Pluchea camphorata (L.) DC. – camphor pluchea - eastern + central United States, Mexico
 Pluchea carolinensis (Jacq.) G.Don – cure-for-all - Latin America, West Indies, Florida
 Pluchea chingoyo (Kunth) DC. - Peru, Chile
 Pluchea dentex R.Br. ex Benth. - Australia
 Pluchea dioscoridis (L.) DC. - Egypt, Middle East
 Pluchea dodonaeifolia (Hook. & Arn.) H.Rob. & Cuatrec. - Bolivia
 Pluchea domingensis Klatt - Hispaniola
 Pluchea dunlopii Hunger - Australia
 Pluchea eupatorioides Kurz - China, Indochina
 Pluchea ferdinandi-muelleri Domin - Australia
 Pluchea fiebrigii H.Rob. & Cuatrec. - Bolivia
 Pluchea foetida (L.) DC. – stinking camphorweed - southeastern United States, Yucatán Peninsula
 †Pluchea glutinosa Balf.f. (extinct)
 Pluchea grevei (Baill.) Humbert - Madagascar
 Pluchea heterophylla Vatke - tropical Africa
 Pluchea hirsuta (L.) Less. - India
 Pluchea indica (L.) Less. – Indian camphorweed, Indian fleabane - India, China, Japan, Southeast Asia, Australia
 Pluchea kelleri (Thell.) Thulin - Somalia
 Pluchea lanceolata (DC.) Oliv. & Hiern - India, Afghanistan, parts of western Africa
 Pluchea lanuginosa C.B.Clarke - India
 Pluchea laxiflora Hook. & Arn. ex Baker
 Pluchea linearifolia C.B.Clarke - eastern India
 Pluchea littoralis Thulin
 Pluchea lucens Thulin
 Pluchea lycioides (Hiern) Merxm. - South Africa
 Pluchea mexicana (R.K.Godfrey) G.L.Nesom - San Luis Potosí
 Pluchea microcephala R.K.Godfrey - Bolivia, Peru, Argentina
 Pluchea nogalensis Chiov. - Somalia
 Pluchea oblongifolia DC. - Brazil
 Pluchea odorata (L.) Cass. – sweetscent, saltmarsh fleabane - from Ontario to Bolivia
 Pluchea ovalis (Pers.) DC. - Arabian Peninsula, Morocco
 Pluchea parvifolia (A.Gray) R.K.Godfrey - Baja California 
 Pluchea polygonata (DC.) Gagnep. - India, Indochina
 Pluchea pteropoda Hemsl. ex Hemsl - China, Indochina
 Pluchea rosea R.K.Godfrey - Mexico, Honduras, south-central + southeastern United States
 Pluchea rubelliflora (F.Muell.) B.L.Rob. - Australia
 Pluchea rufescens (DC.) A.J.Scott - Mauritius
 Pluchea sagittalis Less. – wingstem camphorweed - South America, West Indies
 Pluchea salicifolia (Mill.) S.F.Blake - Mexico, Guatemala
 Pluchea sarcophylla Chiov. - Somalia
 Pluchea scabrida DC. - Philippines
 Pluchea sericea (Nutt.) Coville – arrowweed - southwestern United States, northwestern Mexico
 Pluchea somaliensis (Thell.) Thulin - Somalia
 Pluchea sordida (Vatke) Oliv. & Hiern - tropical Africa
 Pluchea succulenta Mesfin - Somalia
 Pluchea tertanthera F.Muell. - Australia
 Pluchea tomentosa DC. - India
 Pluchea wallichiana DC. - India
 Pluchea yucatanensis G.L.Nesom – Yucatán camphorweed - Yucatán Peninsula incl Belize

 Formerly included
 Allopterigeron filifolius (F.Muell.) Dunlop (as P. filifolia F.Muell.)
 Baccharis decussata (Klatt) Hieron. (as P. decussata Klatt)
 Cratystylis conocephala (F.Muell.) S.Moore (as P. conocephala (F.Muell.) F.Muell.)
 Neurolaena lobata (L.) Cass. (as P. symphytifolia (Mill.) Gillis)
 Streptoglossa liatroides (Turcz.) Dunlop (as P. ligulata F.Muell.)
 Streptoglossa macrocephala (F.Muell.) Dunlop (as P. macrocephala F.Muell.)
 Streptoglossa odora (F.Muell.) Dunlop (as P. odora F.Muell.)
 Thespidium basiflorum (F.Muell.) F.Muell. ex Benth. (as P. basiflora F.Muell.)

References

External links
 
 
 USDA Plants Profile
 Jepson Manual Treatment

 
Asteraceae genera
Taxonomy articles created by Polbot
Taxa named by Henri Cassini